Honolulu Tudor—French Norman Cottages Thematic Group is a thematic resource or multiple property submission that describe fifteen Tudor or French Norman houses in Honolulu, Hawaii. All these houses were listed on the National Register of Historic Places on June 5, 1987.

History
During the boom years of the 1920s, as immigration and tourism to the Territory of Hawaii from the West Coast of the United States increased sharply, many new private homes for the growing middle class showed the design influence of the California bungalows or Mock Tudor English cottages so popular in the Continental United States. One of the most influential architects in Honolulu, Hart Wood, had published a series of articles extolling the appropriateness of the English cottage style for suburban living. In 1920, he moved his practice from San Francisco to Honolulu, where he designed three of the fifteen exemplary English Tudor–French Norman Cottages built during 1923–1932 that were added to the National Register of Historic Places on 5 June 1987.

The Tudor features include asymmetrical, multilevel floor plans and projections, half-timber and stucco facades, small-paned casement windows, and roofs that are either high-pitched or rounded to resemble thatching. Although some of the same features mark grand Tudor mansions like the Charles M. Cooke, Jr., House, these cottages are much more modest structures of one to three stories, built of frame or masonry, with more playful or romantic elements evoking imagined "olde English" or French Norman antecedents. The interiors are designed to be cozy and intimate, with much more wall space than window openings, often with fireplaces and open-beam ceilings.

California regional styles also influenced new public buildings in the Territory. Spanish Colonial Revival and, more broadly, Mediterranean Revival architecture can be seen in Honolulu Hale, President William McKinley High School, the Fire Stations of Oahu, and numerous other public buildings erected during this period.

Listed Properties
The following Honolulu properties were listed on the National Register of Historic Places on June 5, 1987:

References

English-Norman cottages
Houses on the National Register of Historic Places in Hawaii
History of Oahu
Houses in Honolulu County, Hawaii
Spanish Colonial Revival architecture in the United States
Tudor Revival architecture in Hawaii
Mediterranean Revival architecture
Buildings and structures in Honolulu
1987 establishments in Hawaii
National Register of Historic Places in Honolulu